Iorwerth Peate, also known as Cyfeiliog, (27 February 1901 – 19 October 1982) was a Welsh poet and scholar, best known as the founder, along with Cyril Fox, of St Fagans National History Museum.

Born in Llanbrynmair into a family of carpenters, Peate's interest in folk studies and anthropology was kindled when studying Colonial History and Geography at Aberystwyth University under professor Herbert John Fleure and writer T. Gwynn Jones. Peate received an M.A. in 1924 for a dissertation on the anthropology, dialect and folklore of the people living in the Dyfi valley. While studying at Aberystwyth, Peate won university prizes for his poetry and for his participation in the eisteddfod.

Peate began his career by lecturing in rural Ceredigion and Meirioneth, before being appointed in 1927 to catalogue the National Museum of Wales' folk collections.

Inspired by the open-air museums of Scandinavia, Peate had a vision of recreating this style of attraction for Welsh life and culture. His initial attempts were challenged by those outside and inside the academic world. The work on the museum commenced in 1946, thanks to the donation of land from the Earl of Plymouth.

Peate published work on the study of folk life in both English and Welsh. He was a pacifist who registered as a conscientious objector in 1941 and believed in a monoglot Welsh-speaking Wales.

Peate was a judge for the National Eisteddfod for a number of years.

Peate received a number of honours over his life. He was awarded an honorary doctorate by both the National University of Ireland and the University of Wales. He declined a 1963 New Years honour appointment as an Officer of the Most Excellent Order of the British Empire (OBE).

Peate and his wife Nansi are buried in the Unitarian chapel on the grounds of St Fagans National History Museum.

Published works
 Gyda'r wawr (1923)
 Guide to the Collection of Welsh Bygones (1929)
 Cymru a'i phob (1931)
 Y crefftwr yng Nghymru (1933)
 Guide to the Collection Illustrating Welsh Folk Crafts and Industries (1935)
 Welsh Society and Eisteddfod Medals and Relics (1938)
 The Welsh House: a Study in Folk Culture (1940)
 Diwylliant gwerin Cymru (1942)
 Clock and Watch Makers in Wales (1945)
 Canu Chwarter Canrif (1957)
 Tradition and Folk Life: a Welsh View (1972)
 Diwylliant Gwerin Cymru (1975)
 Rhwng Dau Fyd (1976)
 Personau (1982)

References

1901 births
1982 deaths
20th-century Welsh poets
Alumni of Aberystwyth University
People from Montgomeryshire
Welsh conscientious objectors
Welsh-language writers